The tenth season of RuPaul's Drag Race began airing on March 22, 2018, on VH1. The premiere was broadcast one week after the finale of the third season of RuPaul's Drag Race All Stars, and episodes are to be followed by RuPaul's Drag Race: Untucked. Contestants were officially announced on February 22, 2018, in a teaser trailer during an episode of All Stars 3 later followed by a special "Meet the Queens" live-stream on Facebook, hosted by season nine winner, Sasha Velour. This season saw the return of season 9 contestant Eureka O'Hara who was removed from her original season after tearing her ACL. The prizes for the winner of this season include a one-year supply of Anastasia Beverly Hills cosmetics and a cash prize of $100,000. This is the first season in which each episode was 90 minutes long.

The theme song played during the runway segment every episode was "Snapshot", and the song played during the closing credits was "Rock It (To The Moon)", both songs from the album Remember Me: Essential, Vol. 1.

Much like the previous season, it featured the top four contestants of the season advance to the finale, and feature the "Lip-Sync for the Crown" " where there will be two rounds of lipsyncs and the winner of both lipsyncs will move ahead to the final lipsync and who ever wins the final lipsync will be declared as the winner.

The winner of the tenth season of RuPaul's Drag Race was Aquaria, with Kameron Michaels and Eureka being the runners-up, and Monét X Change being Miss Congeniality.

Contestants

Ages, names, and cities stated are at time of filming.

Notes:

Contestant progress

Lip syncs
Legend:

Guest judges
Listed in chronological order:

Christina Aguilera, singer, songwriter, actress 
Halsey, singer, author, actress 
Padma Lakshmi, actress, model 
Courtney Love, singer, songwriter, actress 
Nico Tortorella, actor, model 
Logan Browning, actress 
Tisha Campbell, actress, singer 
Carrie Preston, actress, producer, singer 
Shania Twain, singer, songwriter 
Emily V. Gordon, writer, producer 
Kumail Nanjiani, comedian, actor, writer 
Audra McDonald, actress, singer 
Kate Upton, model, actress 
Andrew Rannells, actor, singer
Billy Eichner, comedian, actor, writer
Abbi Jacobson, comedian, writer, actress
Ilana Glazer, comedian, writer, actress
Miles Heizer, actor, musician
Lizzo, rapper, singer
Lena Dunham, actress, writer, director
Ashanti, singer, songwriter, actress 
Todrick Hall, singer, director, choreographer

Special guests
Guests who appeared in episodes, but did not judge on the main stage.

Episode 1

Adore Delano, runner-up of season 6 and 9th place on All Stars season 2
Bob the Drag Queen, winner of season 8
Chad Michaels, runner-up of season 4 and winner of All Stars season 1
Darienne Lake, 4th place on season 6
Delta Work, 7th place on season 3
Derrick Barry, 5th place on season 8 and 10th place on "All Stars" season 5
Detox, 4th place on season 5 and runner-up of All Stars season 2
Jaymes Mansfield, 14th place on season 9
Jessica Wild, 6th place on season 2
Jiggly Caliente, 8th place on season 4, and 12th place on "All Stars" season 6
Jinkx Monsoon, winner of season 5
Jujubee, 3rd place on season 2, 3rd/4th on All Stars season 1, runner up on "All Stars" season 5, and 3rd place on RuPaul's Drag Race: UK vs the World
Katya, 5th place on season 7 and runner-up of All Stars season 2
Kim Chi, runner-up of season 8
Laganja Estranja, 8th place on season 6
Manila Luzon, runner-up of season 3, 7th/8th place on All Stars season 1 and 6th place on All Stars season 4
Mariah Balenciaga, 10th place on season 3 and 8th place on "All Stars" season 5
Morgan McMichaels, 8th place on season 2 and 5th place on All Stars season 3
Mrs. Kasha Davis, 11th place on season 7
Ongina, 5th place on season 1 and 9th place on  All Stars season 5
Pandora Boxx, 5th place on season 2, 11th/12th place on All Stars season 1, and 6th on All Stars 6
Peppermint, runner-up of season 9
Raven, runner-up of season 2 and All Stars season 1
Tempest DuJour, 14th place on season 7
Trixie Mattel, 6th place on season seven and winner of All Stars season 3
Victoria "Porkchop" Parker, 9th place on season 1
Yara Sofia, 4th place on season 3, 5th/6th place on All Stars season 1, and 10th place on "All Stars" 6

Episode 2
Andy Cohen, television personality
Alyssa Edwards, 6th place on season 5 and 5th place on All Stars season 2

Episode 4
Shawn Morales, Pit Crew member from seasons three to six

Episode 5
Ross Mathews

Episode 7
Bianca Del Rio, winner of season 6
Alex Trebek, game show host

Episode 8
Chad Michaels, runner-up of season 4 and winner of All Stars season 1
Todrick Hall, singer, director, and choreographer

Episode 9
Stephen Colbert, television host
Randy Rainbow, comedian

Episode 10
Anthony Padilla, actor, comedian, and YouTube personality
Chester See, singer, actor, and YouTube personality
Frankie Grande, dancer, actor, singer, and YouTube personality
Kingsley, comedian, blogger, and YouTube personality
Raymond Braun, actor, and YouTube personality
Tyler Oakley, author, and YouTube personality

Episode 11
Cheyenne Jackson, actor, singer

Episode 14
Akashia, 7th place on season 1
BeBe Zahara Benet, winner of season 1
Jade, 6th place on season 1 
Nina Flowers, runner-up and Miss Congeniality of season 1
Ongina, 5th place on season 1
Rebecca Glasscock, 3rd place on season 1
Shannel, 4th place on season 1
Victoria "Porkchop" Parker, 9th place on season 1

Episodes

Ratings

References

External links 

 

2018 American television seasons
RuPaul's Drag Race seasons
2018 in LGBT history